The University of La Verne College of Law is the law school of the University of La Verne, a private university in Ontario, California. It was founded in 1970 and is approved by the State Bar of California, but in 2023 is no longer accredited by the American Bar Association.

History
In 1970, Los Angeles County Superior Court Judge Paul Egly established the law school. In 1985, the school merged with the San Fernando Valley College of Law; however, the two operated as independent entities within the University of La Verne until 2002, when the University of West Los Angeles purchased the San Fernando Valley College of Law campus. In 2001, the law school relocated to Ontario, California.

In 2016, the law school became an ABA-accredited school. However, in November 2019, the College of Law’s board of trustees voted to convert the school from an ABA-accredited institution to one approved by the State Bar of California instead. The move followed an investigation by the school’s faculty and administrators to evaluate the source of declining enrollment and avoid closure. The school’s decision was also influenced by the ABA’s introduction of tougher accreditation standards in May 2019, which shortened the timeframe schools have to ensure a 75-percent bar pass rate from five to two years.

Academic profile

Degrees offered
The school offers the Juris Doctor (JD) law degree, which can be completed on a full-time basis over three years or part-time over four years. The school also offers two dual-degree programs in conjunction with the University of La Verne College of Business and Public Management: the Juris Doctor/Master of Business Administration (JD/MBA) and Juris Doctor/Master of Public Administration (JD/MPA).

Accreditation and bar passage
In 2006, the College of Law first received provisional accreditation by the American Bar Association (ABA). In June 2011, the ABA denied the College full accreditation. On August 29, 2011, the school received approval from the Committee of Bar Examiners of the State Bar of California. In March 2012, the ABA again granted provisional accreditation. Finally, on March 14, 2016, the College received full accreditation from the ABA. 

In November 2019, the College announced plans to relinquish its ABA accreditation and pursue approval from the State Bar of California, which decision was partly influenced by the ABA’s introduction of tougher accreditation standards in May 2019 that shortened the timeframe schools had to ensure a 75-percent bar pass rate from five to two years.

For the July 2021 California Bar Examination, 51% passed of 68 College of Law first time takers, while 14% passed of 37 who had to retake the examination, compared to a 70.5% pass rate of all first time takers and 18.7% for all retakers.

Law reviews, journals and publications
 University of La Verne Law Review  
 Journal of Juvenile Law  
 Journal of Legal Advocacy & Practice  
 Inter alia 
 Grand Jury Training (2003). Published by La Verne College of Law and the California Grand Jurors' Association (video seminar)

Legal clinics and student programs
The College of Law opened a disability rights legal clinic in the summer of 2007, followed by a justice and immigration legal clinic. Additional programs for students include clinical externships and practicums in Family Law and Lawyering Skills.

Costs
For the Fall 2020 semester, La Verne College of Law tuition is $15,600 per semester for all full-time students.

Employment 
According to the La Verne College of Law's official 2019 ABA-required disclosures, 62% found employment while 24% did not (the rest were not seeking employment). Of the people who sought employment, 53% of them went into small firms, while 2% of all graduates went into a medium-sized law firm, 25% went into business, and 19% went into public service.

Noted Alumni
 Jessica Dominguez, American immigration lawyer based in California
 Phil Esbenshade, professional skateboarder
 Vernard Eller, American writer
 Randy Kirner, American politician and member of the Nevada Assembly
 Ronald Richards, criminal defense attorney

References

External links
 

College of Law
Universities and colleges in San Bernardino County, California
La Verne
Ontario, California
Education in San Bernardino County, California
1970 establishments in California
Educational institutions established in 1970
Law schools in California